The Taichung Bank, officially Taichung Commercial Bank, is a public bank headquartered in Taichung, Taiwan.

In 2015, Fitch Ratings assigned ratings to Taiwan's Taichung Commercial Bank (TCB) as follows: 'BB+' (BB plus) Long-term Issuer Default Rating (IDR), 'B' Short-term IDR, 'A-(twn)' National Long-term rating, 'F2(twn)' National Short-term rating, 'bb+' Individual rating, '5' Support rating and 'NF' Support Rating Floor.

In October 2022, the institution's board of directors announced that Taichung Bank was planning to acquire the American Continental Bank.

History
The Bank was formerly the Taichung District Joint Saving Company that was approved and established in April 1953.

See also

List of banks in Taiwan
Economy of Taiwan
Taiwan yen
Old Taiwan dollar
Republic of China
Taichung

References

 
Banks established in 1953
1953 establishments in Taiwan